General Abdul Waheed Kakar  (born 23 March 1937), is a senior officer of the Pakistan Army who served as the 5th Chief of Army Staff, appointed by Prime Minister Nawaz Sharif on 12 January 1993 upon death of his predecessor Asif Nawaz Janjua, he remained in office until retiring on 12 January 1996.

His appointment came in response to the sudden death of tenuring army chief, General Asif Nawaz, and notably superseded five senior high ranking army generals with more years of seniority. General Kakar oversaw the national general elections, after he secured the resignations of President Ghulam Ishaq Khan and Prime Minister Nawaz Sharif to resolve the Constitutional crisis in 1993.

Biography

Abdul Waheed Kakar was born into a Pashtun family of the Kakar tribe in the suburbs of Peshawar, North-West Frontier Province in India on 23 March 1937. His tribe, Kakar, originally hailed from Zhob, Baluchistan in Pakistan, and was fluent in Pashto. His family later had migrated to North and eventually found a way to be settled in Peshawar.

His uncle, Abdur Rab Nishtar, was listed as one of the founding fathers of Pakistan who would later serve as the Governor of Punjab as well as serving as the President of Pakistan Muslim League. After graduating from local high school in 1955, Kakar went to attend the Edwardes College  where he secured his graduation. He joined the Pakistan Army in 1956, and was directed to attend the Pakistan Military Academy in Kakul where he was expected to pass out from the academy in 1958 but was held back for a 6-month term. Eventually, Waheed gained commission in the Frontier Force Regiment in 1959 as a 2nd-Lt.

His combat duty witnessed the military actions in Chawinda in Sialkot Punjab in Pakistan against the Indian Army during the conflict with India in 1965. In 1971, Major Kakar served as the brigade major of an independent infantry stationed at the Sulemanki sector, and fought against the Indian Army. His combat duty during the actions of both wars served his reputation as did scenes of major battles in the respective wars.

After the war, Major Kakar was selected to attend the Command and Staff College in Canada, where he stood first in the examinations and qualified as a psc. He was later selected to attend a staff course program. Upon returning from Canada, he continued his education when he was selected to attend the National Defence University (NDU) where he studied and attained graduation in War studies degree at the Armed Forces War College of the National Defence University.

In 1976–78, Brig. Kakar was appointed as Chief of Staff of the II Corps, stationed in Multan, commanded by then-Lieutenant-General Rahimuddin Khan. In 1984, Major-General Kakar was subsequently given the command of the 16th Infantry Division in Quetta as its GOC. In 1987–89, Maj-Gen. Kakar was appointed as an Adjutant-General at the Army GHQ. At the time he was ordered to admit three students in the Army Medical College but he refused despite direct orders from the President General Muhammad Zia-ul-Haq, as they did not meet the minimum criteria. The President then ordered the increase of overall seats from 60 to 100. In 1989, Lieutenant-General Kakar was posted as field commander of the XII Corps, stationed in Quetta.

Chief of Army Staff 

In summer of 1993, the MoD announced the names of retiring army generals who were due retirement, and such list included Lt-Gen. Kakar as he was also seeking the retirement.

Without consulting the Prime Minister Nawaz Sharif, President Ghulam Ishaq Khan nominated and approved the appointment papers of junior-most Lt-Gen. Kakar to the promotion of senior four-star rank when elevating him as the Chief of Army Staff (COAS).

The appointment was extremely controversial due to Lt-Gen. Kakar superseding at least six senior army generals, including: 
Lieutenant-General Farrakh Khan, Chief of General Staff (CGS) at Army GHQ in Rawalpindi. 
Lieutenant-General Javed Nasir, Director-General of the Inter-Services Intelligence (DG ISI). 
Lieutenant-General Mohammad Ashraf, Field Commander, IV Corps in Lahore.
Lieutenant General Hamid Niaz on secondment to Mari Gas Corporation Limited.
Lieutenant-General Arif Bangash, Quartermaster General (QMG) at Army GHQ in Rawalpindi.
Lieutenant-General Rehem Dil Bhatti, President of National Defence University (NDU).
Among these listed army generals, the CGS, the QMG, and the DG ISI, opted to stay to serve on their assignments despite being overlooked for the promotions.

After his appointment, a member of the National Assembly who belonged to PMPA was quoted: "the era of the Pakhtoons has begun. The president belonged to the Frontier province and so did the new Chief of Army Staff."

After assuming the command of the army as its army chief and contrary to the expectations of President Ghulam Ishaq, General Kakar played a decisive role in resolving the constitutional crises by securing first the resignation of President Ghulam Ishaq and later Prime Minister Sharif in 1993. This allowed the holding of the nationwide general elections that witnessed the return of Pakistan Peoples Party (PPP) led by Benazir Bhutto, who eventually became the Prime Minister of Pakistan. During his tenure, General Kakar was instrumental in securing the government funding for the Shaheen project developed under the PAEC's scientists.

In September 1995, General Abdul Waheed Kakar played a crucial role in sustaining the democracy by having discovered a plot by a group of army officers headed by Major-General Zahirul Islam Abbasi, acting in complicity with the Harkat-ul-Jihad-al-Islami a militant group, to assassinate him and Benazir Bhutto, to capture power. This plan was foiled by the Military Intelligence and the Military Police who initiated the operation to have those involved captured and arrested.

In 1996, General Kakar reportedly declined the extension of his service and there was no public statement on the matter. After his retirement, he never appeared in public and lives a very quiet life in Rawalpindi.

Reception 

General Kakar had an imposing and robust personality that brokered no nonsense.  In the military, he was popular among his colleagues as a flamboyant rider and a mountaineer.

His reception as an army chief was hailed and celebrated by the Pashtuns nationalists when Mahmood Achakzai, then-MNA, reportedly remarked in the news media in 1993: "This is not a General from the Sandhurst colonial brand. I welcome an enlightened man from the rigid mountain ranges of Loralai. He has the professional skills for improving the war performance of the Pakistan Army. But more than that, he is intelligent enough to comprehend politics and will promote the democratic process. General Waheed is not a religious extremist."

Awards and decorations

Foreign Decorations

See also
Civilian control of the military

References

External links 
 Official profile at Pakistan Army website

1937 births
Pashtun people
Edwardes College alumni
Frontier Force Regiment officers
Pakistani military personnel of the Indo-Pakistani War of 1971
Pakistani expatriates in Canada
National Defence University, Pakistan alumni
Pakistani generals
Pakistani democracy activists
Chiefs of Army Staff, Pakistan
Living people